Sung Men is a district (amphoe) of Phrae province, northern Thailand.

History
In 1903 the district name was Mae Phuak (แม่พวก) and was centered in Ban Sung Men. The government changed the district name to Sung Men in 1917.

Geography
Neighboring districts are (from the southwest clockwise) Den Chai, Long, and Mueang Phrae of Phrae Province; Tha Pla and Mueang Uttaradit of Uttaradit province.

The important water resource is the Yom River.

Administration
The district is divided into 12 sub-districts (tambons), which are further subdivided into 109 villages (mubans). The townships (thesaban tambons) Sung Men covers parts of tambon Sung Men. There are a further 12 tambon administrative organizations (TAO).

References

External links
amphoe.com

Districts of Phrae province